Serhiy Yuriyovych Zolotnytskyi (born 9 January 1962) is a Ukrainian football coach and a former player. Last club he managed was PFC Sumy.

Honours
Chornomorets Odessa
Soviet Cup finals: 1985-86

References

External links
 Serhiy Zolotnytskyi at the Football Federation of Ukraine
 

1962 births
Living people
Sportspeople from Donetsk
Soviet footballers
Ukrainian footballers
FC Shakhtar Donetsk players
SKA Kiev players
FC Elektrometalurh-NZF Nikopol players
FC Zorya Luhansk players
Ukrainian expatriate footballers
Expatriate footballers in Poland
Expatriate footballers in Bulgaria
Ukrainian expatriate sportspeople in Poland
Ukrainian expatriate sportspeople in Bulgaria
Ukrainian Premier League players
FC Nyva Vinnytsia players
Wisłoka Dębica players
FC Etar Veliko Tarnovo players
FC Kremin Kremenchuk players
FC Vorskla Poltava players
FC Shakhtar Snizhne players
FC Shakhtar Makiivka players
FC Shakhtar-2 Donetsk players
FC Zirka Kropyvnytskyi players
Ukrainian football managers
Association football goalkeepers
Ukrainian expatriate football managers
Expatriate football managers in Moldova
Ukrainian expatriate sportspeople in Moldova
PFC Sumy managers